Liobagrus hyeongsanensis is a species of catfish in the family Amblycipitidae (the torrent catfishes) endemic to South Korea.

References 

hyeongsanensis
Endemic fauna of South Korea
Fish described in 2015